Richárd Csősz (born 22 April 1997) is a Hungarian football player who plays for Tiszakécske.

Career

Debrecen
On 29 July 2017, Csősz played his first match for Debrecen in a 1-1 draw against Paks in the Hungarian League.

Career statistics

Club

References

External links

1997 births
Living people
Sportspeople from Debrecen
Hungarian footballers
Association football midfielders
Debreceni VSC players
Paksi FC players
Kazincbarcikai SC footballers
Tiszakécske FC footballers
Nemzeti Bajnokság I players
Nemzeti Bajnokság II players
21st-century Hungarian people